Tom and Jerry's Giant Adventure is a 2013 animated fantasy comedy direct-to-video film starring Tom and Jerry, produced by Warner Bros. Animation. Tom and Jerry are the faithful servants of Jack, son of the founder of a struggling storybook amusement park that gets a much-needed boost thanks to some mysterious magical beans. A sequel is in development with Spike Brandt and Tony Cervone returning as directors and producers.

Plot

Tom and Jerry live with Jack and his mother in Storybook Town, a fairy tale-inspired theme park. The park has been ailing since the death of its founder, Jack's father. Young Jack is desperate to save the park from the hands of greedy billionaire Mr. Bigley who bought the park's mortgage, setting out with his loyal cat and mouse friends to sell his performing cow to make the next mortgage payment. Too late to sell it to a nearby circus, they trade the cow to a mysterious farmer named Farmer O'Dell for a handful of magic beans. What follows is a journey up a beanstalk to Fairyland, a magical land ruled by a greedy giant named Mr. Ginormous and home to all manner of fabled characters, some portrayed by classic MGM cartoon characters such as Droopy as Old King Cole and Screwy Squirrel as Simple Simon's pieman. Now, Tom and Jerry must put an end to their furry feud long enough to save both Fairyland and Storybook Town.

Cast
 Spike Brandt as Tom Cat and Jerry Mouse (uncredited)
 William Hanna as Tyke (archive sound, uncredited)
 Jacob Bertrand as Jack Bradley
 Garrison Keillor as Narrator and Farmer O'Dell
 Tom Wilson as Mr. Bigley and Mr. Ginormous
 Kath Soucie as Tuffy
 Joe Alaskey as Droopy as Old King Cole
 Paul Reubens as Screwy Squirrel as the Pieman
 Grey DeLisle as Mrs. Bradley, Red as the Red Fairy
 Richard McGonagle as Barney Bear
 Phil LaMarr as Spike as Old Mother Hubbard's Dog
 John DiMaggio as Meathead Dog as Simple Simon

Reception
Chaz Lipp states the film is "a harmless hour of fun that should ably hold the attention of its target audiences," but confused about the lack of "fighting, chasing and general struggle between the title characters."

Follow-up film
Tom and Jerry: The Lost Dragon was released on September 2, 2014.

References

External links
 

2013 films
2013 animated films
2013 direct-to-video films
2010s American animated films
American adventure comedy films
American children's animated adventure films
American children's animated comedy films
American fantasy adventure films
Animated films based on children's books
2010s children's fantasy films
Animated crossover films
Films based on Jack and the Beanstalk
Films directed by Spike Brandt
Films directed by Tony Cervone
Films scored by Michael Tavera
Films with screenplays by Paul Dini
Tom and Jerry films
Warner Bros. Animation animated films
Warner Bros. direct-to-video animated films
2010s children's animated films
Red (animated character) films
Barney Bear films
Films set in amusement parks
Droopy
2010s English-language films